Anthony "Tony" L. Grande is an American businessman. He is the Chief Development Officer of CoreCivic, formerly Corrections Corporation of America.

Education 
Tony Grande attended Notre Dame High school in Riverside County, CA.  After high school, Grande continued his education at American University in Washington, D.C. where he graduated with a bachelor's degree in Broadcast Journalism. Grande also holds a master's degree in human and organizational development from Vanderbilt University's Peabody School of Education.

Career 
Tony Grande assumed the role of Executive Vice President and Chief Development Officer in July 2008, after having served as Senior Vice President of State Customer Relations since September 2007. Grande joined CCA in 2003, in the newly created role of Vice President of State Customer Relations. In his capacity, Grande manages all existing state contracts, and he leads the company's national efforts to forge new partnerships with state Departments of Corrections. CCA currently serves about half of all states. Tony Grande previously served as Tennessee's Commissioner of Economic and Community Development (ECD). In that role, he led the recruitment and expansion of business to the State, managing an $85 million budget and 200 employees. Having worked in Tennessee government since 1998, Grande served as Assistant Commissioner and later as Deputy Commissioner of ECD. He previously led a publishing and database marketing company and served as a political speechwriter in Washington, DC.

Philanthropy 
Tony Grande currently serves on the non-profit board of The Boys and Girls Club of Tennessee.

References

CoreCivic 
Nashville Lifestyle Magazine 
Linkedin 
Site Selection 
Bloomberg 
Nashville Post 
New York Times 
The Economist 

1969 births
Living people
21st-century American businesspeople
American University School of Communication alumni
CoreCivic people
Peabody College alumni